Palomar College Transit Center (or Palomar College) is a North County Transit District transit hub in San Marcos, California. It consists of a bus station and a train station. The bus station (signed Palomar College Transit Center on site) serves as a terminus for all BREEZE bus lines that pass through San Marcos, and is located at the main entrance at Palomar College. Across the street from the bus depot is the two-platform SPRINTER Palomar College station.

Platforms and tracks

References

External links
SPRINTER Stations

North County Transit District stations
Railway stations in the United States opened in 2008
San Marcos, California
Railway stations in California at university and college campuses
2008 establishments in California